Idris Abdul Karim (born 29 November 1976) is a Malaysian former footballer, now works as scout for Johor Darul Takzim in the Malaysia Super League.

Johor-born defensive midfielder, played with Johor FA for three seasons before moving Pahang FA. He later return to his home town and join club side Johor FC. He later join Negeri Sembilan FA and become influential figure for Hoben Jang Hoben team ever since.

He forged great partnership with veteran midfielder, Rizal Sukiman in their glory years with Johor FA and now forged formidable partnership with former teammates, Rezal Zambery Yahya and national skipper, Muhammad Shukor Adan, who made a return to Negeri Sembilan FA.

Idris also represent Malaysia in 1995 until 2000. He play in a friendly match against Arsenal in 1999. He also represent Malaysia futsal squad in 1999 AFC Futsal Championship.

External links
 
 

1976 births
Living people
Malaysian footballers
Malaysia international footballers
Malaysian people of Malay descent
People from Johor
Association football midfielders
Negeri Sembilan FA players